Caution is the fifth studio album by Hot Water Music, released by Epitaph Records on October 8, 2002.Billboard.com

The track "Remedy" was featured in the soundtrack for Tony Hawk's Underground.

Track listing

Personnel
Chris Wollard
Chuck Ragan
George Rebelo
Jason Black
additional guitar courtesy of Brian Baker

References

Hot Water Music albums
2002 albums
Epitaph Records albums